United Nations Security Council Resolution 404, adopted on February 8, 1977, after hearing from a representative of Benin, the Council reaffirmed that States must refrain from threats and use of force in their international relations and decided to establish a Special Mission composed of three members of the Council to investigate the events of January 16, 1977 against the country. The findings of the report by the Special Mission were examined in Resolution 405.

The incident was brought to the attention of the Council by the People's Republic of Benin on January 26, 1977, after foreign mercenaries attacked the airport and the city of Cotonou but were later forced to retreat.

No details were of the voting were given, other than that it was adopted "by consensus".

See also
 List of United Nations Security Council Resolutions 401 to 500 (1976–1982)
 United Nations Security Council Resolution 419

References

External links
 
Text of the Resolution at undocs.org

 0404
 0404
February 1977 events
1977 in Benin